Take It or Leave It is a British game show, developed by Dutch format company Intellygents, that aired on the digital channel Challenge. Challenge tends to air repeats of classic game shows that have been commissioned by other broadcasters, but it is considered rare that they produce original content. The show originally aired from 23 October 2006 to 18 July 2008 and was hosted by Richard Arnold.

Format
Two teams of two players each compete. One team is brought onto the set and given a brief introduction about a second team. They must then decide whether to play against this team, or reject them in favour of a third team about whom no information is given beforehand. The first team begins the game at one end of a 10-step path, while the chosen opponents sit in the "Sin Bin," a waiting area to one side of the stage.

Phase one
The team in control is asked a question and shown an answer. They must decide whether to "take it" or "leave it," based respectively on whether they believe the answer is correct or incorrect. If they choose to leave it, a second answer is displayed instead and they are automatically committed to taking it. One of the two answers is correct.

Taking the correct answer or leaving the incorrect one allows each team member to choose one safe from a set of 20 displayed on a video wall. Eighteen of these safes contain cash amounts ranging from 1p to £15,000. The two chosen safes are opened one at a time; if the first safe contains cash, the team may either add it to the game's final jackpot and move on to the next question, or reject it in favour of whatever is in the second safe. The remaining two safes contain "Booby Traps" which, if found, immediately force the team to trade places with their opponents in the Sin Bin. Regardless of the outcome, the team advances one step along the path.

Leaving the correct answer or taking the incorrect one forces the two teams to trade places.

Final phase
The team that reaches the end of the path is confronted with six safes, one of which contains the jackpot; the other five are empty. They are asked five questions, each with the "take it"/"leave it" option as before, but are not immediately told which of their answers are correct. After all five questions have been asked, they are displayed in a random order, with any correctly answered questions being displayed first.

As each question is shown, the team must decide whether to play the answer they took. Playing a correct answer eliminates one empty safe, but playing an incorrect answer at any time ends the game and sends the team home with nothing. If the team believes one of their answers is incorrect, they may choose not to play it and are then given one chance to choose a safe; they win the jackpot if they find it, or nothing if they do not.

If the team answers all five questions correctly and chooses to play every answer, they automatically win the jackpot.

Safe values

Trivia
Each show begins with Arnold at the safes saying, "Ten steps, six safes and the chance to play for up to £50,000. It's all about making the right choice at the right time. Would you have the nerve to take it or leave it?"

Take It or Leave It was originally meant to be fronted by Michael Barrymore, but Arnold was settled upon. The show was hailed as the next Deal or No Deal, but has not found the same success. It was filmed in the famous Pinewood Studios, where the popular James Bond movies have been filmed.

During its original run, the show aired weekday nights at 21:00 on Challenge. Before the first two breaks, Arnold would give the details for a viewers' competition, much like Challenge's version of The Pyramid Game. This was during the first two series only and did not return for the afternoon repeats.

The claim of a potential £50,000 top prize was inaccurate during the first two series, since the 10 highest amounts in the safes only added up to £48,750. Beginning with series 3, some of the amounts were increased to bring the total up to £50,000. The highest amount won by any team was £49,300.50.

The Channel 4 game show The Bank Job borrows some of the format of Take It or Leave It.

International versions
The show premiered in Netherlands on 4 March 2006 and was called Kies de kluis. The game show ran for 2 seasons on NED1.

On the Hungarian TV channel RTL Klub was aired the show since 27 December 2007 with shorter/longer breaks. It is called A széf (The safe) and broadcast at 19:00 on weekdays. The show is still popular regularly winning its timeslot. The new season started at 28 March 2012. If the players choose the highest possible combination of the safes, they can win 20,000,000 ft (€80,000). The highest prize in a safe is 7,000,000 ft (€28,000).

Other versions of the game show were also aired in Turkey, Dubai, Greece and North Macedonia.

Transmissions

External links
.
.

2006 British television series debuts
2008 British television series endings
2000s British game shows
Television series by Sony Pictures Television
Television series produced at Pinewood Studios
Television series by Endemol
English-language television shows